Arctic Circle Raceway is a motor racing circuit in Norway. It supports 24-hour racing in full daylight in summer due to the midnight sun. It is the northernmost racetrack in the world.

Circuit information 

The venue was opened on 12 August 1995. The racetrack cost US$10 million to build. It hosted a round of the Swedish Touring Car Championship from 1999 to 2001 and again in 2004. Currently it hosts a non-championship round of the NBF GT Championship, titled as the 'Arctic Circle Midnight Cup'.

Racetrack
Length:           
Width: 
Longest straight: 	          
Pitlane: 
Height difference: , drop 8.6%
Height above the sea: 
Depot area:

Lap records

Unofficial lap records

Superbike:  Daniel Kubberød, Superbike, 1.28.1 (July 2009)
Formula 3:     Pontus Mörth, Formel 3, 1.20.624 (June 1996)
Touring car: Jan «Flash» Nilsson, stcc, Volvo 1:27.323 (August 2000)
Streetcars: Lars Magnussen Mitsubishi Evo 1:29.8 (September 2014)
Running: Lars Kristian Granlund 13:08 (October 2019)

Official lap records

The official race lap records at the Arctic Circle Raceway are listed as:

References

External links
 Official website (Norwegian)
 Reviews of the track

Motorsport venues in Norway
Rana, Norway